The Blackbirds were a German Krautrock band active 1968-1983. The band had a similar sound to New Trolls. The band came together for a 50 year reunion in 2015.

Discography
No Destination, album 1970
Touch of Music, album 1971

References

German experimental rock groups